Nikolai Nikolayevich Pisarev (born 23 November 1968) is a Russian football manager and a former player. He is an assistant coach with Russia national football team.

International career
Pisarev played his first game for Russia on 8 March 1995 in a friendly against Slovakia. He scored a goal in the UEFA Euro 1996 qualifier against Faroe Islands.

Coaching career
On 26 July 2021, he was hired as an assistant to Valeri Karpin in the Russia national football team. On 10 August 2022, Pisarev was hired as a manager by Russian Premier League club Khimki, also keeping his national team position (the national team was banned by FIFA at the time due to the 2022 Russian invasion of Ukraine and was not playing any competitive games). Pisarev was dismissed by Khimki on 2 September 2022, after the team lost all four games since his appointment.

Career statistics
Scores and results list Russia's goal tally first, score column indicates score after each Pisarev goal.

Honours
Spartak Moscow
 Russian Premier League: 1992, 1993, 1994, 1998, 2000, 2001
 Russian Cup: 1994

Russia U21
 UEFA European Under-21 Championship: 1990

References

External links
 Player profile 

Living people
1968 births
Footballers from Moscow
Association football forwards
Soviet footballers
Russian footballers
Soviet Union under-21 international footballers
Russia international footballers
FC Torpedo Moscow players
FC Winterthur players
FC Spartak Moscow players
CP Mérida footballers
FC St. Pauli players
FC Dynamo Moscow players
FC Moscow players
Soviet Top League players
Russian Premier League players
La Liga players
Bundesliga players
Russian football managers
FC Urozhay Krasnodar managers
FC Khimki managers
Russian Premier League managers
Soviet expatriate footballers
Russian expatriate footballers
Russian expatriate sportspeople in Switzerland
Expatriate footballers in Switzerland
Russian expatriate sportspeople in Spain
Expatriate footballers in Spain
Russian expatriate sportspeople in Germany
Expatriate footballers in Germany